The Great Tenor Songbook is the third studio album by Australian tenor, Mark Vincent. The album was released through Sony Music Australia on 19 November 2010 and peaked at number 18 on the ARIA Charts. The album was certified gold.

Track listing
 CD/DD
 "O Sole Mio" - 3:25
 "Funiculi Funicula" - 2:50
 "Caruso" - 5:25
 "Santa Lucia" - 3:44
 "Be My Love" - 3:33
 "La donna è mobile" - 2:10
 "If I Loved You" - 3:17
 "Torna a Surriento" - 4:32
 "Mattinata" - 2:46
 "With a Song in My Heart" - 3:47
 "Because" - 2:09
 "O Holy Night" (with Kate Ceberano) - 4:54

Charts

Weekly charts

Year-end charts

Certifications

Release history

References

2010 albums
Mark Vincent albums
Sony Music Australia albums